Remon van Bochoven (born 27 April 1989) is a Dutch footballer who plays as a striker for DSO Zoetermeer.

Club career
Van Bochoven was the leading goalscorer in the 2011–12 Topklasse campaign with 25 goals in 27 games. After unsuccessful trials at FC Utrecht and Heracles Almelo, Van Bochoven joined Rijnsburgse Boys in the summer of 2012. A year later he moved to new Eerste Divisie side Achilles '29.

After being released by Achilles, van Bochoven returned to Haaglandia, only to move on to Westlandia the next season.

Van Bochoven returned to his first club DSO from Zoetermeer in 2019.

References

External links
 Voetbal International profile 

1989 births
Living people
Footballers from Zoetermeer
Association football forwards
Dutch footballers
Haaglandia players
Rijnsburgse Boys players
Achilles '29 players
Derde Divisie players
Eerste Divisie players
RKVV Westlandia players